Alvin Holsey (born 1965) is a United States Navy vice admiral and naval aviator who has served as the military deputy commander of the United States Southern Command since February 1, 2023. He previously served as commander of the Navy Personnel Command and Deputy Chief of Naval Personnel from January 8, 2021, to December 15, 2022.

A native of Fort Valley, Georgia, Holsey was commissioned through the Naval Reserve Officers Training Corps (NROTC) program at Morehouse College in 1988, where he received a bachelor's degree in Computer Science. In 1995, he earned a Master of Science in Management from Troy State University and attended the Joint Forces Staff College in 2010.

In September 2022, Holsey was nominated for promotion to vice admiral, and assignment as the military deputy commander of U.S. Southern Command.

Awards and decorations

References

Date of birth missing (living people)
1965 births
Living people
Place of birth missing (living people)
People from Fort Valley, Georgia
Morehouse College alumni
Military personnel from Georgia (U.S. state)
African-American United States Navy personnel
United States Naval Aviators
Troy University alumni
Joint Forces Staff College alumni
Recipients of the Legion of Merit
United States Navy admirals
Recipients of the Defense Superior Service Medal
21st-century African-American people
20th-century African-American people